WLLO-LP (102.9 FM, "Leo 103") is a high school radio station broadcasting a High school radio format. Programming includes rock, country, big band, and children's programming. Licensed to Londonderry, New Hampshire, United States, the station serves the Manchester area.  Broadcasts can also be heard on cable FM channel 28 of the local cable TV system.  The station is currently owned by Londonderry School District, School Administrative Unit 12 as an Educational-access television channel.

See also
 High school radio

References

External links
 

LLO-LP
LLO-LP
High school radio stations in the United States
Rockingham County, New Hampshire
Radio stations established in 2004